Løgumkloster (both mean 'Løgum monastery'), is a town in Tønder Municipality in Region of Southern Denmark on the Jutland peninsula in south Denmark with a population of 3,480 (1 January 2022). Its name testifies that the town was once the site of the Cistercian Løgum Abbey, in the then Roman Catholic diocese of Ribe.

Løgumkloster was the municipal seat of the now abolished Løgumkloster Municipality.

Notable people 

 Hans Nicolajsen (1803 in Løgumkloster – 1856 in Jerusalem) a Danish missionary to Palestine for the London Society for Promoting Christianity Among the Jews
Andreas Riis (1804 in Løgumkloster – 1854 in Naksby) a Danish missionary to the Gold Coast for the Basel Evangelical Missionary Society

References 

 Municipal statistics: NetBorger Kommunefakta, delivered from KMD aka Kommunedata (Municipal Data)
 Municipal mergers and neighbors: Eniro new municipalities map

External links 
 Tønder municipality's official website 

Cities and towns in the Region of Southern Denmark
Tønder Municipality